Frederick "Fritz" Scheeren (July 1, 1891 – June 17, 1973), nicknamed "Dutch", was an outfielder in Major League Baseball. He played for the Pittsburgh Pirates.

References

External links

1891 births
1973 deaths
Major League Baseball outfielders
Pittsburgh Pirates players
Youngstown Steelmen players
Wheeling Stogies players
Baseball players from Indiana
Sportspeople from Kokomo, Indiana
Lafayette Leopards baseball players